Los años pasan (English title: The years go) is a Mexican telenovela produced by Valentín Pimstein for Televisa in 1985. It is an original story by Inés Rodena and adapted by Carlos Romero. It is a sequel to another Pimstein-produced telenovela, Los años felices, as well as a new version of Rodena's radionovela La Galleguita.

Laura Flores and Manuel Saval starred as protagonists, while Patsy starred as main antagonist.

Cast 
Laura Flores as María
Manuel Saval as Rodolfo
Guillermo Murray as Alejandro
Patsy as Fabiola Montesinos
Martha Roth as Mercedes
Isabela Corona as Apolonia
Luis Uribe as Gustavo
Fernando Ciangherotti as Armando
Bárbara Gil as Úrsula
Rubí Ré as Virginia
Alberto Inzúa as Sr. Tovar
Aurora Clavel as Chole
Aurora Molina as Petra
Ernesto Laguardia as Cuco
Bolivar Hack as Luciano
Ada Carrasco as Lencha
Jorge Santos as Arturo
Eduardo Díaz Reyna as Felipe
Beatriz Moreno as Fresia
Mónica Prado
Gerardo Murguía
Maria Fernanda Morales
Nadia Haro Oliva
Gloria Morell
Ricardo Cervantes

Awards

References

External links

Mexican telenovelas
1985 telenovelas
1985 Mexican television series debuts
1985 Mexican television series endings
Television shows set in Mexico
Televisa telenovelas
Sequel television series
Spanish-language telenovelas